The following is a list of lost or unfinished animated films.

See also
List of animated films
List of lost films

References

Lost or unfinished
Animated